Mullagh is a parish in the Roman Catholic Diocese of Clonfert in County Galway, Ireland. It is in the south-east of the county, close to the towns of Loughrea, Ballinasloe, and Portumna. Mullagh lies in the civil parish of Abbeygormacan, and spans the townlands of Mullagh Beg and Mullagh More (An Mullach Mór).

A community centre was opened in the area in the early 1980s, and there are cemeteries in Abbeygormacan and Finnure. During Viking times, a river ran close to the location of the Abbeygormacan cemetery, said to be used for the transportation of goods by the monks in the nearby monastery that was located on the site of the cemetery.

Mullagh GAA, the local hurling club, competes in the Galway Senior Hurling Championship. The club has produced a number of inter-county and all-star hurlers, including Tony Reddin and Derek Hardiman.

References

Geography of County Galway